Ilanjodigal is a 1982 Indian Tamil-language romantic comedy film, directed by Rama Narayanan, starring Karthik, Suresh, Radha and Vijayashanti. The film was released on 14 January 1982.

Plot 
Sivagami Nachiyar is an arrogant millionaire who lives with her two daughters Geetha and Sitta in her palatial, ancestral bungalow. She is extremely strict with everyone, including her two daughters, and forbids them from looking out of the house window, or even stepping out of the house. She also insults and rejects many millionaire suitors for them, which disappoints her daughters as they feel that they may not get married at all. However things take a turn when Nachiyar leaves home on an important work for ten days. Relieved, Geetha and Seeta finally venture out of the house. They run into two petty crooks, Buddy Raju and Putturaja. After some hilarious confrontations, they eventually fall in love with them. However, Nachiyar has rejected numerous millionaires themselves, so her daughters know that she will never, in her wildest dreams, accept two petty crooks as her sons-in-law.

On finding out that her daughters are in love with two hapless boys, she arranges their wedding with two princes from France. However they are none other than Buddy Raju and Putturaja in disguise. Nachiyar's brother-in-law, a gym wrestler, had planned the entire event to unite his nieces with the men they loved. After the engagement, Nachiyar find out their true identity and falsely accuses them of stealing her jewels. She quickly arranges her daughters wedding with a millionaire's sons while Buddy Raju and Putturaja are in prison.

Will Geetha and Sitta ever unite with the ones they love? Will Nachiyar ever change her ways? This forms the rest of the story. The movie puts across the quest for freedom, love and relationship in a humorous manner.

Cast 
Karthik as Putturaja
Suresh as Buddy Raju
Radha as Sitta
Vijayashanti as Geetha
Rajasulochana as Nachiyar
Goundamani as Assistant commissioner
Kallapetti Singaram as Commissioner
S. S. Chandran as Nachiyar's Manager
Mani R. V. T. as Gym master and Uncle of Geetha and Sitta
Krishna Rao
Arun Pandian

Production 
Kalaignanam cast Karthik and Radha after being impressed with their performances in Alaigal Oivathillai (1981).

Soundtrack 
Soundtrack was composed by Shankar–Ganesh.

Critical reception 
S. Shivakumar of Mid-Day criticised the film as being "full of cheap vulgarity" and felt it "deserves to be banned". Kalki gave the film a mixed review.

References

External links 
 

1980s Tamil-language films
1982 films
1982 romantic comedy films
Films directed by Rama Narayanan
Films scored by Shankar–Ganesh
Indian romantic comedy films